A fieldstone church is a type of church, built using fieldstone of glacial erratics and glacial rubble. Such cathedrals and monasteries occur mostly in areas where the ice ages have deposited such rock material on the one hand, and where on the other hand there is little or no access to natural rock for quarrying and fashioning. In Europe, the primary areas with fieldstone churches are Saxony-Anhalt, Schleswig-Holstein, Mecklenburg-Vorpommern and Brandenburg (including Berlin) in Germany, as well as Poland, Finland, parts of Scandinavia and the Baltic states. The stones used are often granite, gneiss or quartzite; they can be used both hewn and unshaped. Since some of the churches are painted, the stones are not always visible. Especially in later examples, the fieldstones are often combined with other materials, such as brick or half-timbered parts.

Many fieldstone churches are in the Romanesque tradition, and others are Gothic or in somewhat later architectural styles. The earliest examples date to the 11th century (in some regions later, depending on the date of Christianisation and of the German eastward expansion). Many early examples in Holstein are associated with the activities of St. Vicelinus and are thus known as Vizellinskirchen (Vicellinus churches); they often have round towers. Some of the earliest churches in Denmark (especially Bornholm) are fieldstone-built round churches. The flourish of the development of fieldstone churches was around the end of the 12th century, after which they became less common due to the increasing popularity of brick-built architecture (see Brick Romanesque and Brick Gothic). Their construction mostly ceased at the end of the 16th century. In the context of architectural revival styles, especially of Neo-Romanesque, further fieldstone churches were erected in the late 19th and early 20th centuries.

Gallery

See also 
Medieval stone churches in Finland

References
Ehl, Heinrich: Norddeutsche Feldsteinkirchen. Braunschweig-Hamburg, 1926.
Riediger/Köhler: Feldsteinkirchen, Burgen und Herrensitze im Gebiet des Limes Saxoniae. Reinbek, 1968.
Badstübner, Ernst: Feldsteinkirchen des Mittelalters in Brandenburg und Mecklenburg-Vorpommern. Hinstorff, 2002.
Erhaltung und Instandsetzung von Feldsteinkirchen in Mecklenburg. Motive aus Großmutters Zeit. Schwerin, 2001. 
Pfeifer, Viola: Feldsteinkirchen im Fläming. Ein kunsthistorischer Führer. Berlin, 1997. 
Ibbeken, Hillert: Die mittelalterlichen Feld- und Bruchsteinkirchen des Fläming. Berlin, 1999.

External links 

Gallery of fieldstone churches in High Fläming Nature Park, Branednburg, on wikimedia commons
Informative site about medieval village churches in Brandenburg (in German

Church architecture
Gothic architecture
Romanesque architecture
Romanesque architecture in Germany
Stone buildings